The Women's 4 × 100 metre medley relay competition of the 2014 FINA World Swimming Championships (25 m) was held on 7 December.

Records
Prior to the competition, the existing world and championship records were as follows.

Results

Heats
The heats were held at 11:39.

Final
The final was held at 20:27.

References

Women's 4 x 100 metre medley relay
2014 in women's swimming